Tin Pan Alley is a 1940 musical film directed by Walter Lang and starring Alice Faye and Betty Grable (their only film together) as vaudeville singers/sisters and John Payne and Jack Oakie as songwriters in the years before World War I.

Alfred Newman received the 1940 Academy Award for Best Musical Score for his work on the film, the second of his nine Oscars. The film was also nominated for American Film Institute's 2006 list of the AFI's Greatest Movie Musicals.

Plot
Katie and Lily Blaine are a singing-sister act playing the vaudeville circuit. Songwriters Skeets Harrigan and Harry Calhoun see star potential in the sister act.

Cast
 Alice Faye as Katie Blane
 Betty Grable as Lily Blane
 Jack Oakie as Harry Calhoun
 John Payne as Francis 'Skeets' Harrigan
 Allen Jenkins as Casey
 Esther Ralston as Nora Bayes
 Fayard Nicholas as Dance Specialty
 Harold Nicholas as Dance Specialty
 Ben Carter as Boy
 John Loder as Captain Reginald 'Reggie' Carstair
 Elisha Cook Jr. as Joe Codd
 Fred Keating as Harvey Raymond

Casting

Before filming began, there was said to be a feud between Faye and Grable, although the two actresses had never met. On the first day of production, the actresses quickly got along and became lifelong friends.

Tyrone Power and Don Ameche were considered for the leading roles, but scheduling conflicts took them out of the running.

References

External links
 
 
 

1940 films
1940s romantic musical films
American musical drama films
American romantic drama films
American romantic musical films
American black-and-white films
Films directed by Walter Lang
Films set in London
Films set in New York City
Films that won the Best Original Score Academy Award
20th Century Fox films
Films scored by Alfred Newman
1940s musical drama films
1940 drama films
1940s English-language films
1940s American films